Dora Melegari (27 June 1849 – 31 July 1924) was a Swiss writer who wrote in both French and Italian. Three of her early works were written by a ghost writer. In time she was twice nominated for a Nobel Prize.

Life
Dorette (nickname, "Dora") Melegari was born in Lausanne, 27 June 1849. Her father was the diplomat Luigi Amedeo Melegari and her mother was Marie Caroline Mandrot.

In 1881, Octave Mirbeau ghost wrote the first of three novels for Melagari. Melagari then wrote her own novels, Her ghost writer eventually published books under his own name.

In 1887, she started writing for the Internationale Revue using the nom de plume of Thomas Emery. She wrote literary reviews and in time took a management role with the magazine. In 1900 she published her most well known work in Paris. This was later translated into Italian as Il sonno delle anime and published in Milan in 1903.
Melagari discussed the nature of friendship between women. She criticised women and particularly those of the south for ignoring its benefits. She proposed that this might be because they consider anything that is not love to have little value. Melagari was twice nominated for the Nobel Prize for Literature in 1914 and 1923.

She died in Rome 31 July 1924, and was buried in the Protestant Cemetery in Rome.

Works
Dans la vieille rue, Ollendorff, Paris, 1880 (ghost written)
Expiation, Levy, Paris, 1881
Les incertitudes de Livie, Ollendorff, Paris, 1881
Journal intime de Benjamin Costant et lettres a sa famille et ses amis, Ollendorff, Paris, 1886
Marthe de Thiennes, Levy, Paris, 1886
La duchesse Ghislamé, Paris, 1895
Kirie Eleison, Paris, 1896
Il sonno delle anime, Milan, 1903
La Giovane Italia e la Giovane Europa. Carteggio inedito tra Giuseppe Mazzini e Luigi Amedeo Melegari, 1906
Chercheurs de sources, Fischbacher, Paris, 1908
Caterina Spadaro, Milan, 1908
In cerca di sorgenti, Milan, 1910
La città del giglio, Milan, 1911
La piccola damigella Cristine, Milan, 1913
Artefici di pene e artefici di gioie, Trier, Milan, 1913
Ames et visages des femmes, Paris, 1913
Les Victorieses, Paris, 1913
Amici e nemici, Milan, 1914
Il destarsi delle anime, Milan, 1915
La resurrezione di Lazzaro, Rome, 1915

References

1849 births
1924 deaths
People from Lausanne
Swiss writers in French
Swiss writers in Italian
19th-century Swiss writers
20th-century Swiss writers
19th-century Swiss women writers
20th-century Swiss women writers